Sridhar is an Indian choreographer who has worked in across India's several regional film industries. He has also appeared as an actor, making his debut with Poi (2006) and by making cameo appearances in songs he has choreographed.

Career
Sridhar made his full acting debut in K. Balachander's Poi (2006), appearing in a supporting role. He worked as the choreographer for the "Naaka Mukka" song in Kadhalil Vizhunthen (2008), and was given the responsibility of ensuring the hit song translated well on-screen. Behindwoods.com consequently noted Sridhar "gave it some rocking steps and he more than delivered", listing it as a "signature dance step". Sridhar won further critical acclaim for his work as a choreographer in Prabhu Deva's Engeyum Kadhal (2011), where he collaborated with his mentor for four songs. He also choreographed and appeared in the title song of television series Nadhaswaram.

In 2015, he made his first appearance as a leading actor by appearing the action drama, Pokkiri Mannan directed by Raghav Madhesh. The film released with little publicity and received negative reviews from critics. 

In 2016, he becomes a Director for the movie Savadi.

Filmography
All films are in Tamil, unless otherwise noted.

Choreographer

Films

Television

Director

Actor
Films

Television

Dancer

References

Indian film choreographers
Living people
Artists from Chennai
Indian male dancers
Indian choreographers
Year of birth missing (living people)